Santa Rita District may refer to:

 Santa Rita District, Paraguay, a district in Alto Paraná Department, Paraguay
 Santa Rita District, Nandayure, in Nandayure Canton, Guanacaste Province, Costa Rica

District name disambiguation pages